Valeria Parrella (born 1974) is an Italian author, playwright and activist.

In 2005, her collection of short stories Per grazia ricevuta (For grace received, English translation by Antony Shugaar, 2009) was shortlisted for the Premio Strega, Italy's most prestigious literature award, and it won the Premio Renato Fucini for the best short stories collection. In 2020, she was shortlisted for the Premio Lattes Grinzane.

Bibliography and publications
She was born in Torre del Greco in the Province of Naples, in 1974.

Parrella graduated in Classical Literature at University of Naples Federico II and later specialized in Italian Sign Language. In 2003, she published her first work, the collection of short stories Mosca più balena, for which she was awarded the Premio Campiello in 2004 for the best debut, as well as the Premio Procida-Isola di Arturo-Elsa Morante.

Her stories have appeared in the anthologies Pensa alla salute (2003), Bloody Europe (2004) and La qualità dell'aria (2004) and in numerous journals.

Since 2007, she has also been writing theatre pieces, while in 2008, she published her first novel, Lo spazio bianco, which won the Premio Letterario Basilicata. In 2009, the book was adapted into a movie with the same title, which was presented at the 66th Venice Film Festival. Thanks to this film, Parrella won the award Premio Tonino Guerra for best character at the Bari International Film Festival 2010. She has written several other short stories and novels, she collaborates with the newspapers La Repubblica and L'Espresso and has her own column in the magazine Grazia.

Works
Short Stories
Mosca più balena, minimum fax, Roma. 2003
Per grazia ricevuta, minimum fax, Roma, 2005, For grace received, English translation by Antony Shugaar, Europa editions, 2009
Troppa importanza all'amore, 2015
Novels
Lo spazio bianco, Einaudi, 2008
Ma quale amore, Rizzoli, 2010
Lettera di dimissioni, Einaudi, 2011
Tempo di imparare, Einaudi, 2014
 Enciclopedia della donna. Aggiornamento, Einaudi, 2017
Almarina, Einaudi, 2019

References

Italian women short story writers
1974 births
Living people
People from Torre del Greco
21st-century Italian women writers
21st-century Italian novelists
Italian women novelists
21st-century Italian short story writers
Italian women dramatists and playwrights